The 2005–06 season was Aberdeen's 93rd season in the top flight of Scottish football and their 95th season overall. Aberdeen competed in the Scottish Premier League, Scottish League Cup, Scottish Cup.

Scottish Premier League

Scottish League Cup

Scottish Cup

References

 AFC Heritage Trust

Aberdeen F.C. seasons
Aberdeen